Andreas Heldal-Lund (born 10 December 1964) is a Norwegian anti-Scientology activist best known for operating the website Operation Clambake.

Activist 

Since 2009, Andreas Heldal-Lund has been a member of the board of the national secular humanist organisation Human-Etisk Forbund. Heldal-Lund has also long been a member of the Norwegian Society of Heathens. Since 1996 he has been noted for his criticism against the Church of Scientology, namely as the operator of Operation Clambake. In 2003, he received the Leipzig Human Rights Award from the European-American Citizens Committee for Human Rights and Religious Freedom in the US, an organization which states it is composed of "Scientology opponents from all over the world."

Operation Clambake 

Operation Clambake is a website about Scientology and the Church of Scientology that over the years appeared in the top ten results on Google for the search term "Scientology". Most of the information presented by Operation Clambake is critical of the Church of Scientology and its leadership, although dissenters are given prominent space to air their differences.

Heldal-Lund said that he began criticizing the Church of Scientology in 1996 after reading about a Norwegian ex-Scientologist who successfully sued the Church of Scientology. He has stated many times that he does not object to people practising the religion of Scientology itself, but he objects to the abuse-ridden management of that religion by what he has called the "criminal and corrupt" Church of Scientology.

When actor Jason Beghe decided to leave Scientology in 2008, he contacted Heldal-Lund, who convinced him to meet with Mark Bunker, a critic of Scientology known to the Anonymous group as "wise beard man". Heldal-Lund and Bunker went to Beghe's house, where Beghe participated in an interview about his experiences as a Scientologist. Bunker published a two-hour portion of the three-hour interview to YouTube on 4 June 2008.

In the aftermath of acts against Scientology taken online by the group Anonymous as part of the protest movement Project Chanology, Heldal-Lund released a statement criticizing the digital assault against Scientology. Heldal-Lund commented, "People should be able to have easy access to both sides and make up their own opinions. Freedom of speech means we need to allow all to speak – including those we strongly disagree with. I am of the opinion that the Church of Scientology is a criminal organisation and a cult which is designed by its delusional founder to abuse people. I am still committed to fight for their right to speak their opinion." He also stated that "Attacking Scientology like that will just make them play the religious persecution card ... They will use it to defend their own counter actions when they try to shatter criticism and crush critics without mercy."

Awards 
Leipzig Human Rights Award, 17 May 2003

References

External links 

Heldal-Lund's Scientology site Operation Clambake
Heldal-Lund's personal website: A Life in the World of Andreas
Video of Heldal-Lund being interviewed by Joel Philips: Andreas Heldal-Lund in Hollywood

1964 births
Living people
Norwegian activists
People from Oslo
People from Stavanger
Critics of Scientology
Internet activists
Scientology and the Internet
Bisexual men
Norwegian bisexual people